The Salem Channel is a channel in the Salem Sound that stretches from Winter Island in the city of Salem to Misery Shoal in the city limits of Beverly.

Beverly, Massachusetts
Channels of the United States
Bodies of water of Essex County, Massachusetts
Salem, Massachusetts
Bodies of water of Massachusetts